is a single-member electoral district for the House of Representatives, the lower house of the National Diet of Japan. It is located in the prefecture of Nagasaki. It covers parts of Nagasaki on the main island of Kyūshū – the city of Ōmura and the towns of Kawatana, Hasami and Higashisonogi, Nagasaki in former Higashi-Sonogi ("East Sonogi") -gun (county or district) – and several of the prefecture's island municipalities: the cities of Iki, Tsushima and Gotō and the town of Shin-Kamigotō in Minami-Matsuura/"South Matsuura" district. As of September 2011, 211,289 eligible voters were registered in Nagasaki 3rd district, giving it the second highest vote weight in the country.

Before the electoral reform of 1994, the area had formed part of the four-member Nagasaki 2nd district. Two of the last representatives from the pre-reform 2nd district, Kazuo Torashima (LDP) and Masahiko Yamada (JRP), contested the new single-member 4th district in 1996. Torashima won, he was appointed defence minister in the 2nd Mori Cabinet in 2000. In the 2003 election, he retired and was succeeded by Yaichi Tanigawa. In the landslide election of 2009, Yamada won the district for the first time.

List of representatives

Election results 
Note: The decimals stem from anbunhyō, see Elections in Japan.

References 

Nagasaki Prefecture
Districts of the House of Representatives (Japan)